Borgmann is a surname of German origin. Some of the people by the name are:

Albert Borgmann, philosopher
Bennie Borgmann, American basketball player
Dmitri Borgmann, author
Heinrich Borgmann, German military officer during World War II
Wolfgang Borgmann, singer with the band Mekong Delta (band)

See also
Borgman (disambiguation)